The University of Brescia is an Italian public research university located in Brescia, Italy. It was founded in 1982 and is branched in 4 Faculties.

The University of Brescia was officially established in 1982 with three Schools: Medicine and Surgery, Engineering, Economics and Business. However, the creation phase lasted nearly two decades, so the first attempts to open university courses in Brescia go back to the 1960s.

History
A first initiative came from Ethan Doro, which opened negotiations in the early 1960s to set up a two-year course in Engineering as a branch of Politecnico di Milano. The excessive financial requirements caused the project to lapse. After this first attempt, the creation of the future Schools of Brescia moved along two distinct paths, one concerning the School of Economics, the other those of Engineering and Medicine. In the field of economic studies, in 1964 a School of Industrial Administration was created, offering two-year courses. The creation of the Schools of Engineering and Medicine had a different history. The idea of setting up a university pole in Brescia, following the first failed attempt in the early 1960s, regained strength in the second half of the decade with the birth of the Consorzio Universitario Bresciano (CUB), promoted by the Provincial Administration, the Municipality of Brescia and the Chamber of Commerce.

Organization
The University of Brescia is divided into four main areas and provides the following post-secondary academic degrees:

Notable people

Rectors
Augusto Preti (7 November 1983 – 11 November 2010)
Sergio Pecorelli (11 November 2010 – 31 October 2016)
Maurizio Tira (1 November 2016 – 31 October 2022)
Francesco Castelli (since 1 November 2022)

Degree honoris causa
 Luigi Lucchini, Economics (18 June 1998) 
 Paul Greengard, Medicine (September 2007) 
 Guido Calabresi, Law (21 January 2013) 
 Jeffrey Sachs, Management (12 February 2018)

Alumni
Mariastella Gelmini
Danilo Toninelli

Gallery

See also
 List of Italian universities

Notes and references

External links
 University of Brescia - Official Website (English version)

 
Educational institutions established in 1982
University of Brescia
Buildings and structures in Brescia
Education in Lombardy
1982 establishments in Italy